Safe Men is a 1998 American criminal comedy film written and directed by John Hamburg (in his directorial debut), and stars Sam Rockwell and Steve Zahn as a pair of aspiring lounge singers who are mistaken for ace safe crackers, and get mixed up with a Jewish mobster, Big Fat Bernie Gayle (Michael Lerner) and Big Fat's intern, Veal Chop (Paul Giamatti).

Reception
In August 1998, The New York Times called it a "low-energy comedy with sufficient signs of willingness to stray off the beaten track to indicate that somewhere down the line its writer and director, John Hamburg, will create something far better."  Roger Ebert gave the film one star out of four, saying it "whirls wildly from one bright idea to the next, trying to find a combo that will hold the movie together. No luck." Mick LaSalle gave it "There's no dramatic urgency, no distinct point of view, no question of plot to keep an audience interested. All Safe Men has is the charm of the actors and the occasional friskiness of the writing. That's almost enough to keep the picture alive, minute by minute. Alive is not the same as thriving, but it's better than dead.

In March 2002, The A.V. Club began its review with:
The vast majority of direct-to-video films are not very good, lacking not only star power and budget, but ideas and imagination. Every once in a while, though, a movie is denied a proper theatrical release not because it's bad, but because it just isn't the sort of film for which a studio is willing to risk a multimillion-dollar advertising budget. Safe Men is one of these movies, a modest but engaging crime comedy.

A.V. Club also called the film a "sort of Bottle Rocket Lite, sharing a deadpan, consistently sustained comic tone, as well as a palpable affection for its characters. Almost everyone in Safe Men is pathetic on some level, but first-time writer-director John Hamburg grants even his least significant characters a humanity that gives the film a sort of warm, fuzzy glow.

Songs from the film

DVD release
The movie was released on DVD by Universal Pictures under the Focus Features label on August 15, 2006 with new commentary features and Tick, a short film by John Hamburg about independently contracted bomb defusers starring Michael Showalter.

Mill Creek Entertainment will release the Blu-ray version on July 12, 2022.

References

External links

Films directed by John Hamburg
American buddy comedy films
1990s English-language films
American crime comedy films
1990s crime comedy films
1998 films
Films set in Rhode Island
Films with screenplays by John Hamburg
Films scored by Theodore Shapiro
1998 directorial debut films
1998 comedy films
1990s buddy comedy films
1990s American films
English-language crime comedy films